Kogelbergia  is a genus of flowering plants in the family Stilbaceae described as a genus in 2000.

The entire genus is endemic to the Cape Province region of South Africa.

Species
 Kogelbergia phylicoides (A.DC.) Rourke
 Kogelbergia verticillata (Eckl. & Zeyh.) Rourke

References

Lamiales genera
Stilbaceae
Endemic flora of South Africa